The 1993–94 FIS Cross-Country World Cup was the 13th official World Cup season in cross-country skiing for men and women. The season began in Santa Caterina, Italy, on 11 December 1993 and finished in Thunder Bay, Canada, on 20 March 1994. Vladimir Smirnov of Kazakhstan won the combined men's cup, and Manuela Di Centa of Italy won the women's.

Calendar

Men

Women

Note: Until 1994 Winter Olympics, Olympic races are part of the World Cup. Hence results from those races are included in the World Cup overall.

Men's team

Women's team

Overall standings

Men

Women

Achievements
Victories in this World Cup (all-time number of victories as of 1993/94 season in parentheses)

Men
 , 7 (16) first places
 , 3 (19) first places
 , 1 (5) first place
 , 1 (4) first place
 , 1 (1) first place

Women
 , 6 (8) first places
 , 4 (11) first places
 , 2 (24) first places
 , 1 (3) first place

FIS Cross-Country World Cup seasons
World Cup 1993-94
World Cup 1993-94